Pierre Culliford (25 June 1928 – 24 December 1992) was a Belgian comics writer and artist who worked under the pseudonym Peyo.  His best-known works are the comic book series The Smurfs and Johan and Peewit, the latter in which the Smurfs first appeared.

Biography
Culliford was born in 1928 in the Belgian municipality Schaerbeek, and was the son of an English father and a Belgian mother. In 1952, Culliford married Nine Culliford. They have two children:  Véronique and Thierry.

Career 
Culliford took on the name "Peyo" early in his professional career, based on an English cousin's mispronunciation of Pierrot (a diminutive form of Pierre).

After working briefly at the Compagnie Belge d'Actualités (CBA), a small and short-lived Belgian animation studio, Peyo began making comic strips for daily newspapers such as Le Soir shortly after World War II.  At the beginning of the 1950s, he brought his character Johan to the magazine Spirou, whom he soon gave a companion, the diminutive Peewit; the strip soon became a staple of the weeklies.  Peyo introduced the Smurfs in the Johan and Peewit storyline The Magic Flute in 1958; the characters quickly supplanted Johan and Peewit in popularity and left them behind for their own series.

Peyo's output diminished in the 1970s, at first due to the time he invested in The Smurfs and the Magic Flute (1976), a film adaptation of the Johan and Peewit story "La flûte à six schtroumpfs"; in the 1980s, he put in more time, despite recurring health problems, into an American adaptation of The Smurfs as an animated television series. After the series concluded, he left his publisher Dupuis to found his own publishing house, Cartoon Creation, and a cartoon magazine, Schtroumpf!, which soon folded due to management problems. He joined Le Lombard in 1992 but died a few months later. Since his death, Peyo's children have continued to promote his work under the brand "Peyo".

When the studio folded after the war, the other artists went to work for Dupuis, but Peyo, a few years younger than the others, was not accepted. He made his first comics for the newspaper La Dernière Heure (The Latest Hour), but also accepted many promotional drawing jobs for income. From 1949 to 1952, he drew Poussy, a gag-a-day comic about a cat, for Le Soir. For the same newspaper, he also created Johan.

In 1952, Franquin introduced Peyo to Spirou, a children's Franco-Belgian comics magazine published by Dupuis. Peyo wrote and drew a number of characters and storylines, including Pierrot, and Benoît Brisefer (translated into English as Steven Strong). But his favourite was Johan et Pirlouit (translated into English as Johan and Peewit), which was a continuation of the series Johan he had created earlier. He also continued Poussy in Spirou.

Set in the Middle Ages in Europe, Johan et Pirlouit stars a brave young page to the king, and his faithful, if boastful and cheating, dwarf sidekick. Johan rides off to defend the meek on his trusty horse, while Peewit gallops sporadically behind on his goat, named Biquette. The pair was driven by duty to their king and the courage to defend the underpowered. Peewit only appeared in the third adventure in 1954 but would stay for all later adventures.

Smurfs
The first Smurf appeared in Johan and Peewit on 23 October 1958 in the album La Flûte à Six Schtroumpfs (The Six Smurfed Flute). As the Smurfs became increasingly popular, Peyo started a studio in the early 1960s, where a number of talented comics artists started to work. Peyo himself supervised the work and worked primarily on Johan and Peewit, leaving the Smurfs to the studio.

In 1959, the Smurfs got their own series, and in 1960, two more began: Steven Strong and Jacky and Célestin. Many authors of the Marcinelle school collaborated on the writing, or on the artwork, including Willy Maltaite (aka 'Will'), Yvan Delporte, and Roger Leloup. Peyo became more of a businessman and supervisor and was less involved in the actual creation of the comics. He let his son, Thierry Culliford, lead the studio, while his daughter Véronique was responsible for the merchandising (I.M.P.S. was established in 1985 by her).

The merchandising of the Smurfs began in 1959, with the PVC figurines as the most important aspect until the late 1970s. Then, with the success of The Smurfs records by Pierre Kartner, the Smurfs achieved more international success, with a new boom in toys and gadgets. Some of these reached the United States, where Hanna-Barbera created a Saturday morning animated series in 1981 for which Peyo served as story supervisor. Peyo's health began to fail. In 1989, after his partnership with Dupuis ended, he established Cartoon Creation to publish new Smurf stories. In late 1991, the company was forced to shut down due to mismanagement. The publishing rights were soon sold to Le Lombard. 

Peyo died of a heart attack in Brussels on Christmas Eve 1992, at the age of 64. His studio still exists, and new stories for various series are regularly produced under his name.

In the 2011 film The Smurfs, Peyo was included in the plot as a researcher who studied the myths concerning the Smurfs, who were made to be real-life legendary creatures in the film's storyline.

Awards and honours
 He received the Youth Prize (9–12 years) award 1984 at the Angoulême International Comics Festival, France.
 The 50th anniversary of The Smurfs and the 80th anniversary of the birth of its creator was celebrated by issuing a high-value collectors' coin: the Belgian 5 euro 50th anniversary of The Smurfs commemorative coin, minted in 2008.

Bibliography
Only those comics Peyo collaborated on are listed here: the comics made in those series after his death can be found in the articles for each series. Artist and writers mentioned are only those officially credited: unnamed studio collaborators are not listed here.

Jacky and Célestin, 1960–1978: 10 stories in Le Soir, 4 albums by Dupuis: artwork by François Walthéry, Francis, Jo-El Azara and Mitteï, stories by Peyo, Gos, and Vicq
Johan and Peewit (Johan et Pirlouit), 1952–1970: 13 albums by Dupuis
Natacha, 1992: 1 album by Dupuis, artwork by Walthéry, story by Peyo
: 1991, 1 album by Cartoon Creation
Poussy, 1977–, 3 albums by Dupuis
The Smurfs (Les Schtroumpfs), 1959–, 17 albums by Dupuis: additional artwork by Alain Maury and Luc Parthoens, additional stories by Yvan Delporte, Gos, Thierry Culliford
Spirou et Fantasio, 1969, 1 album by Dupuis, artwork by André Franquin and Jidéhem, story by Peyo and Gos
Steven Strong (Benoît Brisefer), 1960–1978, 7 albums by Dupuis, additional artwork by Will, Walthéry, Marc Wasterlain and Albert Blesteau, additional stories by Yvan Delporte, Gos, and Blesteau

References

External links

 Peyo biography on Lambiek Comiclopedia, lambiek.net
 Peyo biography, dupuis.com 
 Peyo biography The Smurfs official site

 
1928 births
1992 deaths
20th-century Belgian artists
20th-century Belgian writers
Académie Royale des Beaux-Arts alumni
Artists from Brussels
Belgian animators
Belgian comics artists
Belgian comics writers
Belgian humorists
Belgian illustrators
Belgian people of English descent
Belgian satirists
Hanna-Barbera people
Pseudonymous artists